Krister Söderqvist (born 25 February 1959) is a Swedish sailor. He competed in the Tornado event at the 1984 Summer Olympics.

References

External links
 

1959 births
Living people
Swedish male sailors (sport)
Olympic sailors of Sweden
Sailors at the 1984 Summer Olympics – Tornado
People from Åtvidaberg Municipality
Sportspeople from Östergötland County